This is an incomplete list of places in London, England.

Geographic divisions and areas

Neighbourhoods

Aside from the City and the London boroughs themselves, all contemporary districts of London are informal designations; usually based or adapted from historic parish or borough boundaries which were all abolished by 1965. London postcode districts often have an influence over where a place is considered to be although they were not designed for that purpose. All London boroughs are divided into wards which often share the names of London districts, however, they rarely share the historic or commonly accepted contemporary boundaries of those places.

London boroughs
Greater London consists of the City of London and 32 London boroughs, of which 12 are statutory Inner London boroughs and 20 are Outer London boroughs.

† = Outer London for statistics | * = Inner London for statistics

Sub-regions
North London and South London: the division of London by the River Thames
West End of London, Central London, East End of London and the South Bank: sections of the historic urban core
London Docklands: the former docks and now a regeneration area
London Plan sub-regions: North East, North, South East, South West, West
Various postcode areas covering London
Public transport zones: 1 (central London); 2 (inner city); 3 and 4, (inner suburbs); 5 and 6 (outer suburbs)

Political divisions

Geographic features

Hills and highest points

Waterways

Canals

Canal tunnels

Docks

Islands and peninsulas

Lakes

Reservoirs

Rivers

Subterranean rivers

Open spaces

Cemeteries

Parks, gardens, and commons

Remnants of ancient woodlands

Royal Parks

Urban farms

Buildings and structures

Airports

Bridges

Cathedrals and places of worship

Government and parliamentary buildings

Houses and palaces

Legal London

Inns of Court

Markets

Former markets

Covered markets

Street markets

Trade markets

Museums and art galleries

Railway stations

Roadways

Footpaths

Major roads

Roman roads

Streets and squares

Ruins

Shopping arcades

Sporting venues

Theatres and concert halls

Tourist attractions

Former tourist attractions

Windmills

See also
 List of garden squares in London
 List of places in England
 :Category:Geography of London

References

 
London